Al-Wathiq al-Mutahhar (1303 - 1379/80) was an imam of the Zaidi state of Yemen, who was also a poet. A native of As Sudah, he was the son of the powerful imam al-Mahdi Muhammad bin al-Mutahhar who died in 1328. After the death of al-Mahdi, no less than four would-be imams tried to assert their authority over the Zaidi community. One of them was al-Wathiq al-Mutahhar, who made his proclamation in 1330 from Haidah, south of San'a. However, he quickly had to yield to the strongest claimant, al-Mu'ayyad Yahya. Al-Mu'ayyad held the imamate to his death in 1346 or 1349. Although he was not really a mujtahid (a person sufficiently educated to make independent legal-religious interpretations), al-Wathiq briefly succeeded al-Mu'ayyad Yahya in 1349, and seized San'a. Again, however, he was rapidly forced to step down by a stronger candidate, al-Mahdi Ali. After this, he withdrew to teaching and literary activities, and in San'a he would die. His gravestone, in the Great Mosque (al-Jami' al-Kabir) of San'a, is dated in 781 AH (1379/80). Other texts mention the year 802 AH (1399) for his demise. The biography of al-Wathiq al-Mutahhar was written by his cousin an-Nasir bin Ali bin al-Mutahhar. The imam himself is credited with a number of writings. These include a diwan with many poems in younger literary form, and praise poems about Sultan al-Malik al-Afdal. In fact, he is one of the earliest known authors of the vernacular humayni poetry.

See also

 Rassids
 Imams of Yemen

References

Zaydi imams of Yemen
1303 births
1380 deaths
14th century in Yemen
14th-century Arabs
Rassid dynasty